Pange lingua may refer to either of two Mediaeval Latin hymns of the Roman Catholic Church: one by St. Thomas Aquinas and one by Venantius Fortunatus (530-609), which extols the triumph of the Cross. He wrote it for a procession that brought a part of the true Cross to Queen Radegunda in 570. This hymn is used on Good Friday during the Adoration of the Cross and in the Liturgy of the Hours during Holy Week and on feasts of the Cross. The concluding stanza was not written by Fortunatus, but was added later.
When used in the Liturgy the hymn is often broken into smaller hymns such as: Lustra sex qui iam peregit, En acetum, fel, arundo, and Crux fidelis inter omnes.

There is a charming ancient legend that is hinted at in the second verse of this hymn. According to this legend, the wood of the Cross upon which Christ was crucified was taken from that tree which was the source of the fruit of the fall in the Garden of Eden. When Adam died, the legend states, Seth obtained from the Cherubim guarding the Garden a branch of the tree from which Eve ate the forbidden fruit. Seth planted this branch at Golgotha (the place of the skull), which is so named because Adam was buried there. As time went on, the Ark of the Covenant, the pole upon which the bronze serpent was lifted, and other items were made from this tree.

 Pange lingua gloriosi proelium certaminis by Venantius Fortunatus, 6th Century, celebrating the Passion of Jesus Christ. (Also sometimes found as Pange lingua gloriosi lauream certaminis)
 Pange lingua gloriosi corporis mysterium by Thomas Aquinas, 13th Century, celebrating the Institution of the Eucharist.

Musical settings 

 Marc-Antoine Charpentier, 5 settings :
 Pange lingua, motet for 3 voices, 2 treble instruments and bc H.58 (? mid-1670s)
 Pange lingua, motet for 3 voices, 2 treble instruments and bc H.61 (1680 - 81)
 Pange lingua, motet for soloists, chorus, flutes, strings and bc H.64 (? late 1680s)
 Pange lingua, motet for 4 voices and bc  H.68 (? late 1680s)
 Pange lingua, motet pour des religieuses / Pour le Port-Royal, for soloists, union chorus and bc H.62 (1681)

See also 
 Adoro te devote
 Veni Creator Spiritus
 Lauda Sion
 Sacris solemniis
 Verbum supernum prodiens

References

Christian hymns